The lieutenant governor of Illinois is the second highest executive of the State of Illinois. In Illinois, the lieutenant governor and governor run on a joint ticket and are directly elected by popular vote. Gubernatorial candidates select their running mates when filing for office and appear on the primary election ballot together. When the governor of Illinois becomes unable to discharge the duties of that office, the lieutenant governor becomes acting governor. If the governor dies, resigns or is removed from office, the lieutenant governor becomes governor. Under the Illinois Constitution, the Attorney General is next in line of succession to the Governor's office after the lieutenant governor, but does not succeed to the lieutenant governor's office. From the impeachment of Rod Blagojevich in 2009, until the inauguration of Sheila Simon in 2011, Attorney General Lisa Madigan would have become governor if Pat Quinn had vacated the office. Historically, the lieutenant governor has been from either the Democratic Party or Republican Party. The current lieutenant governor is Democrat Juliana Stratton.

Prior to the 1970 Constitution, governors and lieutenant governors were separately elected. The 1970 Constitution introduced joint elections for governor and lieutenant governor, though the candidates were nominated in separate primaries. Following the 1986 and 2010 elections, in which the Democratic nominees for Governor were forced to run with extreme or disfavored lieutenant-gubernatorial nominees, the Illinois General Assembly abolished the separate-primary requirement. The 2014 gubernatorial election was the first one to take place in which gubernatorial and lieutenant gubernatorial candidates ran on the same ticket in the primary election.

Duties
The lieutenant governor of Illinois handles a variety of responsibilities which have been delegated to the office via statute. These duties include serving as Chairman of the Governor's Rural Affairs Council, Chairman of Rural Bond Bank of Illinois, head of the Illinois Main Street Program, and Chairman of the Illinois River Coordinating Council.

In addition to these duties, the lieutenant governor can take on other duties as assigned by the governor or initiate duties of his or her own. An example of this is work by former Lt. Gov. Corrine Wood on women's health issues. The lieutenant governor also serves as a surrogate speaker for the governor around the state and as a representative for state government. The lieutenant governor is a member of the National Lieutenant Governors Association.

Prior to the adoption of the Illinois Constitution of 1970, the lieutenant governor also served as the president of the Senate. Losing this position made the lieutenant governor's job less significant, and contributed to the "boredom" cited by Jim Thompson's first lieutenant governor, Dave O'Neal, who resigned from the office in 1981.

Under the Illinois state Constitution Article V section 7. "If the Lieutenant Governor fails to qualify or if his office becomes vacant, it shall remain vacant until the end of the term." Illinois thus had no lieutenant governor during the two-year interim between Pat Quinn's elevation to the governor's office upon Rod Blagojevich's impeachment conviction, and Sheila Simon's election and inauguration as lieutenant governor.

Like the governor, the lieutenant governor has suites of offices in both Springfield and Chicago.

Qualifications
The lieutenant governor of Illinois serves four-year terms. Inauguration takes place on the second Monday in January following a gubernatorial election. A lieutenant governor is

required to be at least twenty-five years old,
required to be a United States citizen,
required to have been a resident of Illinois for the three years previous to election,
barred from other government positions during the term.

List of lieutenant governors of Illinois 
On three occasions, prior to a 1970 change to the state constitution, the lieutenant governor was of a different political party from the governor. In each instance a Democratic lieutenant governor served under a Republican governor. After the lieutenant governor comes the attorney general.

References

External links

 Official website
 Roster of elected officials, Illinois 2005-2006 Blue Book
 Illinois 2005-2006 Blue Book, Illinois Governor mini-bios

 
1818 establishments in Illinois Territory
Lists of state lieutenant governors of the United States